Gao Huan (born 20 January 1990) is a Chinese badminton player.

Achievements

Summer Universiade 
Men's singles

BWF World Junior Championships 
Boys' singles

Asian Junior Championships 
Boys' singles

BWF Grand Prix 
The BWF Grand Prix had two levels, the Grand Prix and Grand Prix Gold. It was a series of badminton tournaments sanctioned by the Badminton World Federation (BWF) and played between 2007 and 2017.

Men's singles

  BWF Grand Prix Gold tournament
  BWF Grand Prix tournament

References

External links 
 

1990 births
Living people
Badminton players from Liaoning
Chinese male badminton players
Badminton players at the 2014 Asian Games
Asian Games silver medalists for China
Asian Games medalists in badminton
Medalists at the 2014 Asian Games
Universiade medalists in badminton
Universiade silver medalists for China
Medalists at the 2013 Summer Universiade
Medalists at the 2015 Summer Universiade
21st-century Chinese people
20th-century Chinese people